Spilomelinae is a very species-rich subfamily of the lepidopteran family Crambidae, the crambid snout moths. With 4,135 described species in 344 genera worldwide, it is the most speciose group among pyraloids.

Description 
Imagines – the adult life stage – vary considerably in size: the forewing span ranges from 11.5 mm e.g. in Metasia to 50 mm in the robust-bodied Eporidia. In resting position, the moths exhibit a characteristic triangular shape, with the wings usually folded over the abdomen, the forewings covering the hindwings. Some Spilomelinae diverge from this common resting pattern, like Maruca with widely spread wings, and Atomopteryx and Lineodes with narrow wings folded along the body. All Spilomelinae moths have well developed compound eyes, antennae and mouthparts, although in the genera Niphopyralis and Siga the proboscis is lost.

Synapomorphic characters of the subfamily comprise minute or obsolete maxillary palpi, ventrally projecting fornix tympani, and the female genitalia's ductus bursae with a weak sclerotization or a granulose texture. The moths are furthermore characterized by an often bilobed praecinctorium, pointed spinula, and the absence of chaetosemata and of a retinacular hook. A gnathos or pseudognathos can be present or absent and is therefore of little diagnostic value, except for several genera of Agroterini, where the gnathos has a well-developed medial process.

Food plants 
Food plant use is diverse within Spilomelinae, ranging from ferns over gymnosperms to a wide spectrum of angiosperms. The larvae of Niphopyralis live in nests of weaver ants, where they feed on ant larvae. Steniini caterpillars are detritivores.

Many Spilomelinae tribes have a narrow food spectrum, with the larvae feeding on plants of only one or a few plant families, e.g. Lineodini on Solanaceae, Hydririni primarily on Sapindaceae and Convolvulaceae, and Trichaeini on Rubiaceae.

Economic impact 
A number of Spilomelinae are considered "pest species", with their larvae feeding on a variety of economically important crops. Notable representatives are the genera of Leucinodes and Neoleucinodes with larvae feeding on Solanaceae, Cnaphalocrocis and Marasmia damaging Poaceae like Oryza, Sorghum and Zea, the legume pod borers of the genus Maruca on Fabaceae and Amaranthaceae, and Spoladea, who feeds on a variety of different agriculturally important plant families.

The box tree moth, Cydalima perspectalis, whose larvae feed on box trees, a prominent ornamental plant in many parks and gardens, has been accidentally introduced to Europe in the mid-2000s and to North America in 2018.

Systematics 

Until the late 1990s, Spilomelinae were included in the subfamily Pyraustinae as tribe Spilomelini.

In the past, Spilomelinae were believed to be polyphyletic. However, a recent phylogenetic study by Mally et al. (2019), based on molecular genetic and morphological data, found the subfamily to be monophyletic. The study's authors furthermore proposed 13 tribes within Spilomelinae:
Agroterini Acloque, 1897
Asciodini Mally, Hayden, Neinhuis, Jordal & Nuss, 2019
Herpetogrammatini Mally, Hayden, Neinhuis, Jordal & Nuss, 2019
Hydririni Minet, 1982
Hymeniini Swinhoe, 1900
Lineodini Amsel, 1956
Margaroniini Swinhoe & Cotes, 1889
Nomophilini Kuznetzov & Stekolnikov, 1979
Spilomelini Guenée, 1854
Steniini Guenée, 1854
Trichaeini Mally, Hayden, Neinhuis, Jordal & Nuss, 2019
Udeini Mally, Hayden, Neinhuis, Jordal & Nuss, 2019
Wurthiini Roepke, 1916

"Non-euspilomeline" tribes 
Hydririni, Lineodini, Udeini and Wurthiini share several plesiomorphic characters with the sister group of Spilomelinae, the Pyraustinae. These plesiomorphies are: absence of longitudinal strips on the male abdominal segment 8; male genitalia with a straight to concave valva costa and a phallus with an evenly sclerotized apodeme; female genitalia with a lanceolate “ediacaroid” signum in the corpus bursae and in several taxa with an appendix bursae attached to the corpus bursae.

Due to these plesiomorphies, these four Spilomelinae tribes are referred to as "non-euspilomeline" tribes as opposed to the monophyletic "euspilomeline" group that represents a more derived group of Spilomelinae. The "non-euspilomeline" tribes form a paraphylum as they do not comprise the "euspilomelines".

"Euspilomeline" tribes 

The tribes Agroterini, Margaroniini, Spilomelini, Herpetogrammatini, Hymeniini, Asciodini, Trichaeini, Steniini and Nomophilini form the monophylum of "euspilomelines" (Greek eu- for "good" or "true"), all sharing a common ancestor. The synapomorphies of euspilomelines are: male abdominal tergite 8 with an emarginate anterior edge; male genitalia with partly sclerotized hair pencils on the anterior edge of vinculum-tegumen connection, with a convex valva costa, and the phallus without a coecum and the sclerotization of the phallus apodeme reduced to a ventral, longitudinally sclerotized strip along the manica; female genitalia with a longitudinal membranous strip in the antrum, and the lack of a strongly sclerotised colliculum between antrum and ductus seminalis.

Genera currently unplaced in any Spilomelinae tribe 
Based on the morphological synapomorphies and characteristics of these tribes, Mally et al. (2019) assigned numerous Spilomelinae genera to these proposed tribes, so that about two thirds of the 339 Spilomelinae genera are placed in these tribes, leaving 132 genera currently unplaced:

Aboetheta Turner, 1914
Acicys Turner, 1911
Aediodina Strand, 1919
Agrammia Guenée, 1854
Almonia Walker, 1866
Ametrea Munroe, 1964
Archernis Meyrick, 1886 (= Chrysommatodes Warren, 1896, Metoportha Meyrick, 1894, Protonoceras Warren, 1890)
Arxama Walker, 1866
Atelocentra Meyrick, 1884
Auchmophoba Turner, 1913
Bacotoma Moore, 1885 (= Epactoctena Meyrick, 1937, Platamonia Lederer, 1863, Platamonina J. C. Shaffer & Munroe, 2007)
Cangetta Moore, 1886
Carthade Snellen, 1899
Chabula Moore, 1886
Chromodes Guenée, 1854
Cissachroa Turner, 1937
Coelorhyncidia Hampson, 1896
Coptobasis Lederer, 1863
Coremata Amsel, 1956
Cotachena Moore, 1885
Criophthona Meyrick, 1884
Camptomastix Warren, 1892 (= Camptomastyx Hampson, 1896)
Cangetta Moore, 1886 (= Blechrophanes Turner, 1937)
Carthade Snellen, 1899 (= Chartade Neave, 1939)
Cavifrons Zeller, 1872
Ceratarcha Swinhoe, 1894
Chabula Moore, 1886
Chromodes Guenée, 1854
Cissachroa Turner, 1937
Coelorhyncidia Hampson, 1896
Coptobasis Lederer, 1863
Coremata Amsel, 1956 (= Culcita Amsel, 1957)
Cotachena Moore, 1885 (= Mesothyris Warren, 1892, Syndicastis Meyrick, 1889)
Criophthona Meyrick, 1884 (= Conoprora Turner, 1913)
Daulia Walker, 1859 (= Girtexta Swinhoe, 1890)
Deuterarcha Meyrick, 1884
Deuterophysa Warren, 1889
Dichocrocis Lederer, 1863 (= Zebrodes Warren, 1896)
Discothyris Warren, 1895
Dracaenura Meyrick, 1886
Duzulla Amsel, 1952
Ebuleodes Warren, 1896
Ectadiosoma Turner, 1937
Elbursia Amsel, 1950
Eudaimonisma T. P. Lucas, 1902
Eulepte Hübner, 1825 (= Acrospila Lederer, 1863)
Eurybela Turner, 1908
Eustenia Snellen, 1899
Furcivena Hampson, 1896
Gadessa Moore, 1885
Gethosyne Warren, 1896
Glauconoe Warren, 1892
Goniorhynchus Hampson, 1896
Hemopsis Kirti & Rose, 1987
Heterudea Dognin, 1905
Hyalea Guenée, 1854
Indogrammodes Kirti & Rose, 1989
Ischnurges Lederer, 1863 (= Nesolocha Meyrick, 1886)
Legrandellus J. C. Shaffer & Munroe, 2007
Lepidoneura  Hampson, 1896
Leucinodella Strand, 1918
Leucochromodes Amsel, 1956
Leucophotis Butler, 1886
Lipararchis Meyrick, 1934
Luma Walker, 1863 (= Pelena Moore, 1886, Pelina Hampson, 1897, Petena Neave, 1940)
Macaretaera Meyrick, 1886 (= Trichoptychodes Swinhoe, 1894, Trigonophylla Turner, 1937)
Macrobela Turner, 1939
Malaciotis Meyrick, 1934
Malickyella Mey & Speidel, 2010
Meekiaria Munroe, 1974
Merodictya Warren, 1896
Mesocondyla Lederer, 1863
Metallarcha Meyrick, 1884 (= Panopsia Turner, 1913)
Metoeca Warren, 1896
Metraeopsis Dognin, 1905
Microgeshna J. C. Shaffer & Munroe, 2007
Microphysetica Hampson, 1917 (= Falx Amsel, 1956, Falcimorpha Amsel, 1957)
Mimudea Warren, 1892
Mukia Amsel, 1954
Myriostephes Meyrick, 1884
Myrmidonistis Meyrick, 1887
Nacoleia Walker, 1859 (= Aplomastix Warren, 1890, Orthocona Warren, 1896, Semioceros Meyrick, 1884)
Nankogobinda Rose & Kirti, 1986
Nausinoe Hübner, 1825 (= Lepyrodes Guenée, 1854, Phalangiodes Guenée, 1854)
Nausinoella J. C. Shaffer & Munroe, 2007
Neostege Hampson, 1910
Nevrina Guenée, 1854
Nistra Walker, 1859
Notesia Yamanaka, 1992
Ommatobotys J. C. Shaffer & Munroe, 2007
Orphnophanes Lederer, 1863 (= Syntomodora Meyrick, 1894)
Orthospila Warren, 1890
Osiriaca Walker, 1866 (= Myriotis Meyrick, 1885)
Otiophora Turner, 1908
Paramecyna Amsel, 1961
Pectinobotys Munroe, 1959
Pelinopsis Dognin, 1905
Physematia Lederer, 1863
Piletocera Lederer, 1863 (= Alutefa Swinhoe, 1900, Danaga Moore, 1885, Diplotyla Meyrick, 1886, Ellogima Turner, 1913, Erebangela Meyrick, 1886, Graphicopoda Butler, 1886, Hormatholepis Butler, 1886, Ptilaeola Meyrick, 1886, Rinecera Butler, 1884, Sematosopha Meyrick, 1937, Strepsimela Meyrick, 1886)
Plateopsis Warren, 1896
Platygraphis Dyar, 1918
Pleonectoides Hampson, 1891
Polythlipta Lederer, 1863
Praeacrospila Amsel, 1956
Praephostria Amsel, 1956
Pramadea Moore, 1888
Preneopogon Warren, 1896
Prionopaltis Warren, 1892
Prorodes Swinhoe, 1894 (= Idiostrophe Warren, 1896)
Proternia Meyrick, 1884
Protonoceras Warren, 1890 
Pycnarmon Lederer, 1863 (= Aripana Moore, 1886, Entephria Lederer, 1863, Eutrichotis Swinhoe, 1900, Pyralocymatophora Strand, 1918, Satanastra Meyrick, 1890)
Pylartes Walker, 1863
Pyradena Munroe, 1958
Ravanoa Moore, 1885
Rehimena Walker, 1866
Rhimphaliodes Hampson, 1893 (= Rhimphaleodes Hampson, 1896)
Rhynchetria Klunder van Gijen, 1913
Sagariphora Meyrick, 1894
Sameodesma Hampson, 1918
Sedenia Guenée, 1854
Sericophylla Turner, 1937 (= Sericophora Turner, 1937)
Stenorista Dognin, 1905
Syllepte Hübner, 1823 (= Arthriobasis Warren, 1896, Haitufa Swinhoe, 1900, Haliotigris Warren, 1896, Neomabra Dognin, 1905, Nothosalbia Swinhoe, 1900, Polycorys Warren, 1896, Subhedylepta Strand, 1918, Sylepta Hübner, 1825, Syllepta Hübner, 1826, Troctoceras Dognin, 1905)
Syngropia Hampson, 1912
Syntrita Dognin, 1905
Tabidia Snellen, 1880
Tanaophysopsis Munroe, 1964
Tasenia Snellen, 1901
Torqueola Swinhoe, 1906
Trichoceraea Sauber in G. Semper, 1902
Trigonobela Turner, 1915
Trithyris Lederer, 1863
Troctoceras Dognin, 1905
Tylostega Meyrick, 1894
Voliba Walker, 1866 (= Gabrisa Walker, 1866, Stereocopa Meyrick, 1885)
Xanthomelaena Hampson, 1896
Zagiridia Hampson, 1897

Genera excluded from Spilomelinae 
Aporocosmus Butler, 1886 was transferred to Odontiinae, Orthoraphis Hampson, 1896 to Lathrotelinae, Hydropionea Hampson, 1917 and Plantegumia Amsel, 1956 to Glaphyriinae, and Prooedema Hampson, 1896 to Pyraustinae.

See also
List of crambid genera

References

External links

 
Moth subfamilies
Taxa named by Achille Guenée